Allen Edison Stairs (December 22, 1924 – October 10, 2010) was a Canadian businessman and politician. Known by Edison, after graduating high school he attended the University of New Brunswick but interrupted his education during World War II to join the Royal Canadian Air Force. He served until after V-E Day in 1945 and following his discharge from the military settled in Woodstock, New Brunswick where he established an insurance business.

From a family active in community affairs, his great-uncle Ernest W. Stairs had been a member of the Legislative Assembly of New Brunswick from 1935 to 1939. Edison Stairs was elected as the Progressive Conservative Party member for Carleton in 1960, 1963, and 1967, sitting as a member of the Official Opposition. Reelected in 1970, his party formed the government led by Premier Richard Hatfield, and Stairs was immediately named to the Cabinet. He held several positions until 1976 when, as Minister of Finance and Chairman of NB Power, he resigned from Cabinet to be with his terminally ill wife. Stairs remained a member of the Legislature until 1978 but retired from politics upon the passing of his wife.

His cousin, Gerald Merrithew, was elected both provincially (1972–1984) and federally (1984–1993).

References

External links 
 Government of New Brunswick, Department of Agriculture (PDF file)

1924 births
2010 deaths
Businesspeople from New Brunswick
Canadian military personnel of World War II
Progressive Conservative Party of New Brunswick MLAs
Members of the Executive Council of New Brunswick
People from Carleton County, New Brunswick
Finance ministers of New Brunswick